Ekipa was a short-lived sports daily published in Belgrade, Serbia. Right from the first issue on April 18, 2005, it attempted to bite into the market held for decades by Sportski žurnal and Sport dailies.

The paper went about their goal by offering bold, often bordering on sensationalist, coverage of day-to-day sporting events, as well as wider on-going trends in sport.

The very first issue set the tone fittingly. It featured an in-your-face cover headline screaming "Shame", as teaser for an interview with Milorad Kosanović, former Serbia-Montenegro under-21 national team and Red Star Belgrade coach, in which he claimed the Serbia-Montenegro league is entirely rigged.

Initially, Ekipa turned a lot of heads, but soon found itself short-strapped for attention grabbing topics. It wasn't able to ride the initial wave of attention nor did it succeed in making a significant dent into the market still firmly held by two established sports dailies. At this point, the original group of owners sold the daily to Radisav Rodić (owner of Kurir and Glas javnosti).

In late October 2005, barely 6 months into its overall run, new owner Radisav Rodić pulled the plug on Ekipa, making the October 29th issue its last. Couple of days later, under the same ownership, new daily called Start was launched.

Defunct newspapers published in Serbia
Sports mass media in Serbia
Sports newspapers
Publications established in 2005
Publications disestablished in 2005
Mass media in Belgrade